Turn It Around is the debut studio album by hardcore punk band Comeback Kid. It was released on March 4, 2003, on the independent label Facedown Records. It was also released on vinyl by Give Me Strength.

Track listing

Credits
 Scott Wade – lead vocals
 Jeremy Hiebert – lead guitar, backing vocals
 Andrew Neufield – rhythm guitar, backing vocals
 Cliff Heide – bass
 Kyle Profeta – drums
 Jon Bain (One of These Days) – guest vocals on "Always"

References

Comeback Kid albums
2003 debut albums
Facedown Records albums